Misa Eguchi was the defending champion, but chose not to participate.

Risa Ozaki won the title, defeating Asia Muhammad in the final, 6–3, 6–3.

Seeds

Main draw

Finals

Top half

Bottom half

References 
 Main draw

Bendigo Women's International - Singles